Isak Vanlalruatfela (born 19 May 2001) is an Indian professional footballer who plays as a winger for Indian Super League club Odisha.

Career 
Isak played in the NECS Cup for Bawngkawn LC, and was later moved up to Bengaluru FC, in 2018/19 season he was signed by Aizawl F.C. from Electric Veng FC. He made his professional debut for the Aizawl against Chennai City F.C. on 16 November 2018, He was brought in as substitute in the 69th minute as Aizawl lost 1–2.

On 24 June 2020, isak joined Indian Super League club Odisha FC. He scored his first league goal on 30 November 2021 in a thrilling 6–4 win over SC East Bengal.

Career statistics

Club

References

2001 births
Living people
People from Mizoram
Indian footballers
Aizawl FC players  
Footballers from Mizoram
I-League players
Association football midfielders
Indian Super League players
Odisha FC players